Schwarzithrips is a genus of thrips in the family Phlaeothripidae.

Species
 Schwarzithrips glyphis
 Schwarzithrips zammit

References

Phlaeothripidae
Thrips
Thrips genera